Emerson L. Allsworth (born August 24, 1926) is a politician and lawyer in the American state of Florida. He served in the Florida House of Representatives from 1959 to 1966, representing Broward County.

References

1926 births
Living people
Democratic Party members of the Florida House of Representatives
Politicians from Miami
20th-century American politicians